Rivignano Teor is a comune (municipality) in the Province of Udine in the Italian region Friuli-Venezia Giulia.

It was established on 1 January 2014 by the merger of the municipalities of Rivignano and Teor.

References

External links
 Official website

Cities and towns in Friuli-Venezia Giulia